James Roderick Macalpine-Downie (9 May 1934 – 9 January 1986), known as Rod Macalpine-Downie, was an English multihull sailboat designer and sailor.

Son of Lieutenant-Colonel Archibald James Macalpine-Downie (died 1958), M.B.E., Royal Tank Regiment, of a landed gentry family of Appin, he was a King's Scholar at Eton with a focus on biology, but seriously considered a career as a concert violinist. Macalpine-Downie and his wife, Shirley Agnes (née Reid), had two sons and a daughter.

Design career
After seeing a Shearwater catamaran while chicken farming in Scotland, Macalpine-Downie resolved to design a superior vessel, producing the Thai Mk4 catamaran.

The Thai Mk4 was extremely successful, winning all six races of the 1962 European 'one of a kind' regatta, in addition to the first International Catamaran Challenge in 1963.

Legacy
Macalpine-Downie is said to have been the first to try both 'una rig' and wing masts.

His two most famous designs were the high-speed Crossbow multihulls which set sailing speed records in the 1970s and 1980s.  The Crossbow proa set a speed record of 26.30 knots in 1973. Its successor, Crossbow II, set a new record in 1980 of 36.00 knots, a mark which was not surpassed till 1986.

Death
Macalpine-Downie died in 1986, aged 52. A new Crossbow design was partly completed, which Macalpine-Downie believed was capable of 70+ knots.

Designs
British Oxygen - a 70 foot catamaran designed for Gerry Boxall and Robin Knox-Johnston, and in which they won the 1974 two handed Round Britain race
Buccaneer 18 sailing dinghy
Crossbow and Crossbow II multihulls
Gloucester 15 sailing dinghy
Mirrorcat catamaran
Mutineer 15 day sailer
Phoenix 18 catamaran
Iroquois (Mk2 launched 1969) racer/cruiser 30’/9.3m catamaran, a very successful design with over 400 built by Sailcraft Ltd, UK
Comanche 32 (1978) cruiser 32’/9.8m catamarans, a very successful design built by Sailcraft Ltd, UK
Apache cruiser 41’/12.5m catamaran built by Sailcraft Ltd, UK

See also
Catamaran
Shearwater I
Thai Mk4

References

1934 births
1986 deaths
Multihull designers
British designers
People educated at Eton College